Scythris angustella is a moth of the family Scythrididae. It was described by Kari Nupponen in 2009. It is found in Uzbekistan. The habitat consists of edges of large saline deserts with halophytic vegetation.

The wingspan is 12.5–13 mm.

Etymology
The species name refers to narrow and somewhat elongate forewings and is derived from Latin angustus (meaning narrow).

References

angustella
Moths described in 2009
Moths of Asia